Horticulture Week is a British horticultural periodical, covering nursery production, garden retail, landscaping, arboriculture, garden heritage, groundsmanship and amenity horticulture.

History and profile
Horticulture Week was established in 1840. The publisher is Haymarket Group.

In November 2006 the magazine's publisher Haymarket Group bought rival horticulture magazine Grower, which is now incorporated into Horticulture Week, expanding its coverage into edibles production.

In 2008 the website of Horticulture Week was started.

The magazine is normally read by around 25,000 subscribers. However, in 2020 this rose to 300,000 through trial subscriptions as interest in gardening increased during the UK lockdown in the COVID-19 pandemic.

See also
List of horticultural magazines

References

External links
 Official site

Horticultural magazines published in the United Kingdom
Magazines established in 1840
Weekly magazines published in the United Kingdom
1840 establishments in the United Kingdom